Game World Navigator is a Russian computer games magazine founded in 1997. It is owned by Navigator Publishing, which also produced other gaming magazines.

The magazine is published monthly and features news of the video game industry, previews of future games and reviews of the latest popular games. Much attention is being paid to massively multiplayer online games.

The magazine's motto originally was "PC Only & Forever". It was featured on an every Navigator cover until 2012.

References

External links
  

1997 establishments in Russia
Magazines established in 1997
Magazines published in Moscow
Monthly magazines published in Russia
Russian-language magazines
Video game magazines published in Russia